Olathia is a community in north-central Douglas County, Missouri United States.  It is located approximately six miles southeast of Mansfield along Missouri Route U and is nine miles northeast of Ava. It is on a ridge between Puncheon Camp Creek one-half mile to the northeast and Bryant Creek one and a quarter mile to the southwest.

The community has also been referred to as Olathe and was presumably named for Olathe, Kansas. The community had a post office between 1895 and 1910.

References

Unincorporated communities in Douglas County, Missouri
Unincorporated communities in Missouri